It's... Madness Too is a compilation album by the British pop band Madness, released in 1991. It combines some of the band's hit singles and b-sides and is a sequel to It's... Madness, released the previous year.

Track listing
"The Prince"
"Madness"
"One Step Beyond"
"Mistakes"
"The Return of the Los Palmas 7"
"Night Boat to Cairo"
"Shut Up"
"A Town With No Name"
"Cardiac Arrest"
"In the City"
"Our House"
"Walking with Mr. Wheeze"
"Tomorrow's (Just Another Day)"
"Victoria Gardens"
"The Sun and the Rain"
"Michael Caine"

Certifications and sales

References

External links

1991 compilation albums
Madness (band) compilation albums
Virgin Records compilation albums